Thomas Mackenzie (1793 – 9 June 1856) was a British Conservative Party politician.

References

External links
 

Members of the Parliament of the United Kingdom for Highland constituencies
Scottish Tory MPs (pre-1912)
UK MPs 1835–1837
UK MPs 1837–1841
UK MPs 1841–1847
1793 births
1856 deaths